Union Township is an inactive township in Monroe County, in the U.S. state of Missouri.

Union Township was established in 1831, and named for the federal union.

References

Townships in Missouri
Townships in Monroe County, Missouri